The Vancouver Wine and Jazz Festival is an annual music and fine wine festival that takes place every year at Esther Short Park in Vancouver, Washington. It has been held every year since 1998 (except 2020), and brought in approximately 13,500 people in 2012, and between 12,000 and 15,000 in 2011. The Wine and Jazz festival is part of the concert series of Bravo! Vancouver. The 2012 festival featured artists such as Diane Schuur, Arturo Sandoval, Al Jarreau, Coco Montoya, The Christopher Brothers, and John Hammond, Jr. The festival has brought visitors from 15 states and Canada.

This festival went on hiatus in 2020.

References

Tourist attractions in Vancouver, Washington
Festivals in Washington (state)
Wine festivals in the United States
Jazz festivals in the United States
Festivals established in 2011
2011 establishments in Washington (state)